Hamanaka (written: 浜中) is a Japanese surname. Notable people with the surname include:

, Japanese mixed martial artist
Sheila Hamanaka, American writer and illustrator
, Japanese copper trader

Japanese-language surnames